Pierre Paul Brandebourg, also Peter Brandenbourg (1824-1878) was a Luxembourg painter and photographer. He was the first to open a photographic studio in the city of Luxembourg.

Early life and family

Brandebourg's parents were Charles Brandebourg, a gardener, and Anne Lambert. After completing high school at Luxembourg's Athénée, he first studied art under the Luxembourg painter Jean-Baptiste Fresez before spending terms at the academies of Paris, Antwerp and Munich. Returning to Luxembourg, on 4 May 1850, he married Catherine Kranenwitter from Rollingergrund. Both his son Charles (Carl) (1851–1906) and his grandson Emile followed in his footsteps, working as photographers in Luxembourg.

Career

Although Brandebourg was recognized as a competent artist with his paintings of men at work and scenes of the harbour in Antwerp or the steel factories of Luxembourg, he had difficulty in making a living from art alone.  He therefore turned to photography, opening Luxembourg's first photographic studio on the Fish Market. As a result of the care he took with composition and lighting, having one's portrait taken "chez Brandebourg" became increasingly popular.

Brandebourg died in 1878 at his home on Avenue Amélie in Luxembourg. Most of his paintings and photographs are still privately owned. Some can be seen in Luxembourg's Photothèque. Charles Bernhoeft took over his photographic business.

References

Luxembourgian photographers
1824 births
1878 deaths
People from Luxembourg City
Academy of Fine Arts, Munich alumni
Alumni of the Athénée de Luxembourg
19th-century Luxembourgian painters
19th-century male artists
Male painters